Mjölby Södra IF is a Swedish football club located in Mjölby.

Background
Mjölby Södra IF currently plays in Division 4 Östergötland Västra which is the sixth tier of Swedish football. They play their home matches at the Lundbyvallen in Mjölby.

The club are affiliated to Östergötlands Fotbollförbund. Mjölby Södra IF played in the 2007 Svenska Cupen but lost 0–4 at home to Rynninge IK in the first round.

Season to season

In their most successful period Mjölby Södra IF competed in the following divisions:

In recent seasons Mjölby Södra IF have competed in the following divisions:

Footnotes

External links
 Mjölby Södra IF – Official website
 Mjölby Södra IF on Facebook

Football clubs in Östergötland County
Association football clubs established in 1948
1948 establishments in Sweden